Turbonilla solomonensis is a species of sea snail, a marine gastropod mollusk in the family Pyramidellidae, the pyrams and their allies.

References

 Peñas A.; Rolán E. (2010). Deep water Pyramidelloidea of the tropical South Pacific: Turbonilla and related genera. In: Gofas S. (ed.) Tropical Deep Sea Benthos 26. Mémoires du Muséum National d'Histoire Naturelle. 200: 1–436.

External links
 To Encyclopedia of Life
 To World Register of Marine Species

solomonensis
Gastropods described in 2010